The Seventh-day Adventist Hospital, Ottapalam  is a charitable mission hospital in Ottapalam in the Palakkad district of Kerala, India. It was established in 1969 as a part of a health care unit of the worldwide organisation - the Seventh-day Adventist Church. The hospital lies adjacent to the Palakkad - Shoranur highway.

History 
The Adventist Church has formed the trust Council of Seventh-day Adventist Hospitals (COSDAH) and later Medical Trust of Seventh-day Adventists, which is a registered body under the Societies Registration Act XXI of 1860, Reg. No.516 of 1999, under which the hospitals are embedded. The trust operates on a no-loss no-profit basis.

The medical trust operates 11 hospitals across the country, under the umbrella of the Seventh-day Adventist denomination; these hospitals are affiliated to institutions like Loma Linda Medical Center. Four of the hospitals have nursing schools attached. The schools are being upgraded to the collegiate level.

The hospital role in serving the local community covers part of the district of Palakkad. The hospital serves a population of about 3,000,000. There are 210 beds. The hospital owns 33 acres of land.

The hospital had many developments under the leadership of Pr. P A Varghese as Business Manager (2006-2012)
 College of Nursing 
 Renovated Operation Theater 
 Renovated ICU 
 New Casulality Block
 New Mourtury Block
 Renovated Private Rooms
 New Echo and TMT machines 
 New Digital X Ray Machine
 Renovated Quarters 
 Improved Laundry 
 New College Buses
 New Hostel Block

Events
The hospital founded the Golden Jubilee Marathon, which is run on the palakkad-ponnani highway.

Services 

The hospital offers the following services:
 General Medicine
 General Surgery
 Obstetrics & Gynaecology
 Paediatrics
 Orthopaedics
 Community Health
 Anesthesiology
 Dental
 Ophthalmology
 Urology

College of Nursing 
The SDA School of nursing has been in operation since 2001 with the accreditation of Kerala Nurses and Midwives Council and the Indian Nursing Council. In order to meet the health demands of the society and to upgrade the training of the students, the school of nursing was upgraded to a  College of Nursing offering a bachelor's degree in nursing, 
affiliated to the Kerala University of Health sciences. The students graduating are well trained and well placed both in India and abroad.The College Was started under the leadership of Dr. Rajkumar ,Medical Director and Pr. P A Varghese ,Business Manager.

See also 

 List of Seventh-day Adventist hospitals
 List of hospitals in India

References

External links 

 
 

1969 establishments in Kerala
Hospital buildings completed in 1969
Hospitals in Kerala
Buildings and structures in Palakkad district
Hospitals affiliated with the Seventh-day Adventist Church
Charitable hospitals
20th-century architecture in India